Carnival Youth is a Latvian indie rock band formed in Riga in 2011. The band consists of twins Edgars Kaupers (guitar, vocals) and Emīls Kaupers (drums, vocals), Roberts Vanags (keyboards, vocals) and Kristiāns Kosītis (bass).

On May 26, 2014, the group released their first EP, titled Never Have Enough, which was followed by their first studio album, No Clouds Allowed on October 20 the same year, which won the Latvian Golden Microphone award for best debut.

In January 2016, the band was awarded the European Border Breakers Award (EBBA) for their success abroad, where they, at the same occasion, also won the EBBA Public Choice Award. In the spring of 2016, their second studio album, Propeller, was released.

On June 1, 2017, their third album, Vienā vilcienā was released. To this date, it is their only album to be sung exclusively in their native language, Latvian. The choice to sing exclusively in Latvian, rather than in both Latvian and English as on previous albums, was allegedly due to Latvia celebrating its centenary of independence the year after, in 2018. 

Two years later, the group followed up with their fourth studio album, Good Luck. In May 2020, the group appeared on the album Leto bez interneta by Russian rock band Mumiy Troll, performing a Latvian language version of the song Leto bez interneta, titled Vasara bez internetiem.

In addition to their home country of Latvia, the group has performed in countries such as Canada, the United States Austria England, Hungary, Finland, France and Germany, as well as festivals such as SXSW, The Great Escape, Sziget, Positivus, Open'er, Reeperbahn, Eurosonic, Summer Sound.

Discography

EP's 
 Never Have Enough (2014)

Studio albums 
 No Clouds Allowed (2014)
 Propeller (2016)
 Vienā vilcienā (2017)
 Good Luck (2019)
 Naivais ku-kū (2021)

Notes

References

External links 
 Official website (in Latvian)

Musical groups established in 2011
Latvian rock music groups
Latvian indie rock groups
2011 establishments in Latvia